The DX-10 was an entry-level Fujifilm digital camera featuring an 810,000 pixel sensor (1024x768 or 640x480 image size) and a fixed-focus lens. It was introduced in 1999.

References

External links 

DX-10 review

DX-10